The Braddock Road was a military road built in 1755 in what was then British America and is now the United States.  It was the first improved road to cross the barrier of the successive ridgelines of the Appalachian Mountains. It was constructed by troops of Virginia militia and British regulars commanded by General Edward Braddock of the Coldstream Guards, part of an expedition to conquer the Ohio Country from the French at the beginning of the French and Indian War, the North American portion of the Seven Years' War. George Washington was an aide-de-camp to General Braddock (one of his favorites) who accompanied the expedition. The expedition gave him his first field military experience along with other American military officers. A number of these men would profit from this experience during the Revolutionary War.

Construction
In 1755, Braddock was sent to remove the French from Fort Duquesne (Pittsburgh). Starting from Fort Cumberland, General Braddock ordered 600 men, commanded by Major Chapman and John St. Clair to cut a military road over Haystack Mountain. The road followed an Indian path known as Nemacolin's path which had been improved by George Washington and Christopher Gist for the Ohio Company. Compton's task was to build the road to Little Meadows, about 20 miles away.

After a day of road-building, Maj. Chapman's men had only built two miles of road and had destroyed three wagons trying to get over the treacherous terrain encountered on the mountain. Braddock was about to dispatch 300 more men to the road crew when he was informed, by Lt. Spendlowe of the Navy detachment, of an easier route through the Narrows.

Braddock took approximately 1400 men, with accompanying wagons, along Spendlow's route and joined Chapman's road at Spendlow's Camp, in today's LaVale, MD

Braddock met defeat east of Fort Duquesne and was fatally wounded. He was buried in the middle of the road he built, and his soldiers marched over the grave, with the hope of concealing the grave's location from the Indians. The grave was found years later by road workers and the grave was moved. The site is now marked by a marble monument erected in 1913.

The Forbes Expedition, a more successful British expedition mounted against Fort Duquesne in 1758, used a different route through the mountains west of Carlisle, Pennsylvania along what became known as Forbes' Road.

The Cumberland Road, which subsequently became part of the National Road and later U.S. Route 40, roughly parallel Braddock's Road between Cumberland, Maryland, and Laurel Ridge near Uniontown.

In August 1908 and again during June and July 1909, John Kennedy Lacock, a Harvard professor originally from Amity, near Washington, Pennsylvania, was able to identify the path of Braddock's march.  He hired Ernest K. Weller to photograph the road. Lacock's commissioned photographs survive in the form of postcards, which he published in 1910, and his written account was published in the Pennsylvania Magazine of History and Biography in 1914. The road Lacock discovered was a road made by over 30 years of colonial settlers following Braddock's trail.

See also

 Great Britain in the Seven Years War
 Forbes Road

References

Footnotes

Sources
 John Kennedy Lacock, "Braddock's Road," Pennsylvania Magazine of History and Biography, XXXVIII, 1 (1914), pp. 1–38.
 Will H. Lowdermilk, History of Cumberland, Clearfield Co., October 1997, Paperback, . Full Text Online
Steve Colby, General Braddock's Road Over Haystack Mountain, West of Fort Cumberland", (https://www.facebook.com/permalink.php?story_fbid=10151673387202667&id=226549977666)
 Cassandra Vivian, The National Road in Pennsylvania, Arcadia Publishing, 2004, 
 Norman L. Baker, Braddock's Road: Mapping the British Expedition from Alexandria to the Monongahela'', The History Press, 2013, .

External links

John Kennedy Lacock Postcards and Photographs

Historic trails and roads in Maryland
Historic trails and roads in Pennsylvania
Historic trails and roads in the United States
History of Cumberland, MD-WV MSA
Pre-statehood history of Maryland
Pre-statehood history of Pennsylvania
Roads in Pennsylvania
Streets in Pittsburgh
U.S. Route 40